The International Telecommunication Union (ITU) allocates call sign prefixes for radio and television stations of all types. They also form the basis for, but may not exactly match, aircraft registration identifiers. These prefixes are agreed upon internationally, and are a form of country code. A call sign can be any number of letters and numerals but each country must only use call signs that begin with the characters allocated for use in that country.

With regard to the second and/or third letters in the prefixes in the list below, if the country in question is allocated all callsigns with A to Z in that position, then that country can also use call signs with the digits 0 to 9 in that position. For example, the United States is assigned KA–KZ, and therefore can also use prefixes like K1 or K9.

While ITU prefix rules are adhered to in the context of international broadcasting, including amateur radio, it is rarer for countries to assign broadcast call signs to conventional AM, FM, and television stations with purely domestic reach; the United States, Canada, Mexico, Japan, South Korea, and the Philippines are among those that do. Canada presents one notable exception to the ITU prefix rules: it uses CB for its own Canadian Broadcasting Corporation stations, whereas Chile is officially assigned the CB prefix. Innovation, Science and Economic Development Canada's broadcasting rules indicate this is through a "special arrangement", without elaborating. In any case, the two countries are geographically separate enough to prevent confusion; Canada's shortwave broadcasters and amateur radio stations have always used one of its assigned ITU prefixes.

Unallocated and unavailable call sign prefixes

Unallocated: The following call sign prefixes are available for future allocation by the ITU. (x represents any letter; n represents any digit from 2–9.)

 E8, E9, H5, J9, On, S4, T9*, Un, V9, Xn, YZ*, Z4–Z7, Z9, 4N*.

(* Indicates a prefix that has recently been returned to the ITU.)

Unavailable: Under present ITU guidelines the following call sign prefixes shall not be allocated. They are sometimes used unofficially – such as amateur radio operators operating in a disputed territory or in a nation state that has no official prefix (e.g. S0 in Western Sahara, station 1A0 at Knights of Malta headquarters in Rome, or station 1L in Liberland). (x represents any letter; n represents any digit from 2–9.)

 nn, x0, x1, 0x, 1x, Qx.
 no prefixes beginning with Q are used—they may be confused with Q codes. Note that this applies to prefixes only - suffixes are the responsibility of the allocating country.
 no prefixes with the digits 1 or 0 are used—they may be confused with the letters I or O.
 two digit prefixes (nn) are not as yet considered by the ITU.

Allocation table

See also
 Call-sign allocation plan
 Non-ITU prefix
 Amateur radio call signs
 Aircraft registration

Notes

References

External links 

 ITU table of international callsigns

Call signs
Amateur radio call signs